Słodków Trzeci  is a village in the administrative district of Gmina Kraśnik, within Kraśnik County, Lublin Voivodeship, in eastern Poland. In Słodków, there is source of Wyżnica, the right inflow of Wistula.

In 2006 the village had a population of 700.

References

Villages in Kraśnik County